The World Doubles Championship, also known as the Hofmeister World Doubles (1982–1986) or the Fosters World Doubles (1987) for sponsorship purposes, was a non-ranking team snooker tournament held from 1982 to 1987 as the major  event.

History 
Created to capitalise on the growing popularity of televised snooker, as well as to offer a slightly different version of the game, the event was initially staged at the Crystal Palace in London, sponsored by Courage Brewery through their Hofmeister brand. 29 pairs entered the event, which was played from the last 16 in London.

Due to poor attendance of the inaugural event it was moved to the Derngate Centre in Northampton. In 1987 the sponsorship of the event was moved to the Fosters brand, but the sponsorship contract expired the same year. By the end of the 1980s, other more significant events were making up the snooker calendar and the tournament was eventually abandoned. Four of the six tournaments were won by the pairing of Steve Davis and Tony Meo.

Winners

References

External links

World Doubles Championship
Snooker non-ranking competitions
Snooker competitions in England
Recurring sporting events established in 1982
Recurring events disestablished in 1987
1982 establishments in England
1987 disestablishments in England
Sport in Northampton
Defunct snooker competitions
Defunct sports competitions in England